Wild mango may refer to
 Wild growing forms of the mango, Mangifera indica
 Buchanania obovata, a medium sized tree native to Australia, in the family Anacardiaceae
 Cordyla africana, a large tree native to eastern Africa, in the family Fabaceae
 Irvingia gabonensis, a large tree native to western Africa, in the family Irvingiaceae